Janošik (Slovak: Jánošík) is a village in Serbia. It is situated in the municipality of Alibunar, in the South Banat District, in the province of Vojvodina. The village has a Slovak ethnic majority (91,63%) and a population of 1,171 people (2002 census).

Name
The modern name of the village is of Slovak origin. The historical Serbian name of the village was Aleksandrovac (Александровац), i.e. "the place of Aleksandar / Alexander" and the meaning of this name is also reflected in Hungarian name version Újsándorfalva, which means "(new) village of Alexander". Another Serbian name used for the village was Slovački Aleksandrovac (Словачки Александровац), i.e. "Slovak Aleksandrovac".

History
The village was founded in 1812 by Hungarian Count Fülöp Sándor de Szlavnicza and was named after him as Újsándorfalva.

Notable residents
The village is the birthplace of the Hungarian Lutheran theologian and writer Andor Járosi (1897–1944).

See also
List of places in Serbia
List of cities, towns and villages in Vojvodina

References
Republika Srbija, Republički zavod za statistiku, Popis stanovništva, domaćinstava i stanova u 2002, Stanovništvo 1, Nacionalna ili etnička pripadnost - podaci po naseljima, Beograd, Februar 2003.
Slobodan Ćurčić, Broj stanovnika Vojvodine, Novi Sad, 1996.
Borislav Jankulov, Pregled kolonizacije Vojvodine u XVIII i XIX veku, Novi Sad - Pančevo, 2003.

External links

Official Website of Janošik 

Populated places in South Banat District
Populated places in Serbian Banat
Alibunar
Slovak communities in Serbia